Lugnano may refer to:

Lugnano in Teverina, a municipality in the province of Terni, Italy
Lugnano, Città di Castello, a village in the province of Perugia, Italy
Lugnano, Vicopisano, a village in the province of Pisa, Italy